Alexander Egger (born 22 December 1979) is an Italian professional ice hockey defenseman who is currently Captaining Italian club, HCB South Tyrol in the Austrian Hockey League (EBEL). He also represents the Italian men's National ice hockey team. In the 2013–14 season, Egger led HCB to the EBEL championship in their inaugural Austrian season.

He participated at the 2010 IIHF World Championship, among other international competitions. Egger attended the 2014 Men's World Ice Hockey Championships for Italy in Belarus

At 2017 IIHF World Championships Egger scored on his own empty net. The error briefly received international media attention.

References

External links

1979 births
Living people
Bolzano HC players
Italian ice hockey defencemen
Ice hockey people from Bolzano
Germanophone Italian people
Ritten Sport players